Cinquemani is an Italian surname. Notable people with the surname include:

Francesco Cinquemani, Italian screenwriter, director and journalist
Michael J. Cinquemani, American television writer

Italian-language surnames